The 1904 Washington football team was an American football team that represented the University of Washington during the 1904 college football season. In its third season under coach James Knight, the team compiled a 4–2–1 record and outscored its opponents by a combined total of 113 to 66. After serving as captain in 1902 as well, Fred McElmon led the squad once more.

Schedule

References

Washington
Washington Huskies football seasons
Washington football